Andrew Catalon (born September 7, 1979) is an American sportscaster. He has announced NFL on CBS, PGA Tour on CBS, College Basketball on CBS, NBA on CBS and NCAA March Madness.  He has done play-by-play alongside James Lofton on National Football League (NFL) telecasts since 2017.

Early life and education
Catalon grew up in the Short Hills section of Millburn, New Jersey and graduated in 1997 from Millburn High School. He attended the S. I. Newhouse School of Public Communications at Syracuse University, graduating in 2001. At Syracuse, he worked for the WAER-FM.

Career
Catalon was the sports director at WVNY until its news department was shuttered in September 2003 due to financial troubles. He joined WNYT as the weekend sports anchor three months later in December. He eventually was the station's primary sports anchor until his requested demotion to part-time status was granted in December 2012. By then, he had play-by-play basketball assignments with the UConn Huskies women's team for SNY and the Mountain West Conference on CBS Sports Network. He also freelanced at WFAN before joining CBS Sports Network on a full-time basis after his departure from WNYT on July 19, 2013. Catalon served as a tennis play-by-play announcer for the 2016 Olympic Games and has called the Masters Tournament and PGA Championship in golf.

On March 22, 2014, Catalon was announcing an NCAA Tournament game of Gonzaga against Oklahoma State. In order to get back into the game, Oklahoma State was intentionally fouling Gonzaga's Przemek Karnowski, a poor free throw shooter. Catalon called this strategy "hack a polack", to which his broadcasting partner Mike Gminski immediately said "Easy now." Catalon had to apologize on air for his use of a racial slur and to Karnowski personally. Karnowski tweeted that he appreciated the apology.

In 2022, he was inducted into Syracuse University's WAER Hall of Fame.

Personal life
Catalon lives in New Jersey with his wife, Jessica Layton, who is a news reporter. They have a son, CJ.

References

External links
Andrew Catalon on Twitter

1980 births
Living people
Millburn High School alumni
People from Millburn, New Jersey
American television sports announcers
College basketball announcers in the United States
National Football League announcers
College football announcers
Olympic Games broadcasters
S.I. Newhouse School of Public Communications alumni
Curling broadcasters